IMZ-Ural is the manufacturer of Ural sidecar motorcycles.

In 1940, the Soviet Union acquired the design and production techniques for BMW R71 motorcycles and sidecars. The first M-72 model was finished in 1941. Originally, factories were to be located in Moscow, Leningrad (now Saint Petersburg), and Kharkiv, but due to the approach of Nazi German troops, the Moscow facilities were moved to Irbit, and the Leningrad and Kharkiv facilities to Gorkiy (now called Nizhny Novgorod).

Plans for the M-72 were later sold to the Nanchang Aircraft Manufacturing Corporation, a Chinese industrial firm, to build the Chang Jiang.

History

The origins of the IMZ-Ural are linked to developments in the Eastern Front during World War II. The Soviet Union was preparing for possible military action by Nazi Germany. Joseph Stalin ordered the Soviet military to prepare in all possible areas, including the ground forces that would be defending the Soviet Union against invading German tanks and infantry. Mobility was especially stressed after the Soviet Union had witnessed the effect of the blitzkrieg on Poland.

A meeting was held at the Soviet Defence Ministry to devise a motorcycle that would be suitable for the Red Army. The Red Army wanted to modernize its equipment after the suspension of the Winter War with Finland. The motorcycles used up to that point had not been satisfactory; their technology was outdated and the manufacturing quality was inadequate to endure the harsh Russian climate and terrain.

The motorcycle was "modeled after a late-1930s BMW sidecar bike called the R71, which Nazi Germany provided to the Soviet Union after the countries signed the nonaggression Molotov–Ribbentrop pact in 1939."

According to official accounts, after lengthy discussion, the BMW R71 motorcycle was found to closely match the Red Army's requirements. Five units were covertly purchased through Swedish intermediaries. Soviet engineers in Moscow dismantled the five BMWs, reverse engineered the BMW design in every detail and made molds and dies to produce engines and gearboxes in Moscow. Early in 1941, the prototypes of the Dnepr M-72 motorcycle were shown to Stalin who made the decision to enter mass production. One of the original BMWs purchased through the Swedish intermediaries survives, and is displayed in the IMZ-Ural factory museum.

In 1941, BMW began series production of the R75 and ended production of the R71.

As production escalated, the Moscow Motorcycle Plant was established, producing hundreds of Russian M-72 sidecar motorcycles. The Nazi Blitzkrieg was so fast and effective that Soviet strategists worried that the Moscow factory was within range of German bombers. The decision was made to move the motorcycle plant east, out of bombing range and into the resource rich Ural mountain region. The site chosen was the town of Irbit, located on the fringe of Siberia in the Ural mountains. Irbit had been an important trade centre in Russia; the site of the second largest fair in Russia before the Revolution of 1917.

The only available substantial building was a brewery outside of town, beyond the railway line. It was converted into a research and development building to prepare for the construction of a massive new facility to build the M-72 motorcycle. On October 25, 1942 the first batch of motorcycles went to the front. During WWII a total of 9,799 M-72 motorcycles were delivered for reconnaissance detachments and mobile troops.

After WWII the factory was expanded, and in 1950 the 30,000th motorcycle was produced.

Initially, the "URAL" was built for the military only. In the late 1950s, the KMZ plant in Ukraine assumed the task of supplying the military, and the Irbit Motorcycle Works (IMZ) focused on making bikes for domestic consumers. In the late 1950s the full production of the plant was turned over to non-military production. In 1957, the M-72 production lines were sold to the People's Republic of China.

The export history of URALs started in 1953, at first to developing countries. Between 1973 and 1979, Ural was one of the makes marketed by SATRA in the UK as Cossack motorcycles.

Modern-day products 

The main products today are the heavy duty Ural sidecar motorcycles with two-wheel-drive designed for rough, rugged terrain, and cT model for urban commuting and paved road touring. There are many places in Russia where poor roads, or a lack of roads, makes horses and URAL motorcycles necessary to transport gear. URAL motorcycles have four-stroke, (as of 2014) fuel injected air-cooled, flat-twin engines, a four speed gear box with reverse gear, shaft drive, two disc dry clutch, spring shock absorbers, and (as of 2014) disc brakes on all three wheels. The company has developed an engine that meets the standards required by the modern sporting and leisure rider. Though the outward appearance of the engine is the same as before, new quality control techniques employ better alloying and casting, better engineering tolerances, and better paint, powder coating and stainless steel exhausts  while retaining the advantage of continuity with the inherently balanced design of a horizontally-opposed flat twin engine with roller bearings in a solid frame.

The motorcycles are mainly exported to Australia, the UK, France, Netherlands, Belgium, Spain, Greece, Norway, Finland, Iceland, Sweden, Germany, Egypt, Iran, South Africa, Brazil, Uruguay, Paraguay, and the US. The number sold since the factory was founded exceeds 3.2 million. IMZ-Ural is the only Russian manufacturer of large capacity motorcycles and one of few manufacturers of sidecar motorcycles in the world.

Like most motorcycle manufacturers, Ural now sources pre-made components in many cases — buying alternators from Nippon Denso, brakes from Brembo, handlebar controls from Domino, forks from Paioli, ignitions from Ducati Energia, etc.  The company makes the frame, engine and body parts.

The 2003 USA model featured a newly designed crankshaft and a disc brake in front. This addressed weaknesses in the older five-piece, press-fit crankshaft. The old crankshaft was fine for the low-compression models made in the 1990s, but it did not endure the higher compression needed to pass United States Environmental Protection Agency (EPA) standards, and the higher speeds on US highways. In 2004, the company fixed another weak point, the alternator attachment. The alternator is gear-driven off the camshaft. All pre-2007 UK model Urals were fitted with a Russian-designed alternator. Post 2007 models are fitted with a Nippon Denso unit. In 2007, Ural switched to a Ducati electronic ignition, and used new engine and transmission gears, designed by Herzog in Germany, providing a quieter engine and smoother-shifting transmission. For the 2010 year, the rear drive was strengthened. Production in 2010 was 800 vehicles and the factory employed 155 people. Major changes were made to the motorcycle for the 2014 model year, including disc brakes on all three wheels, fuel injection and a hydraulic steering damper. Also, most models are powder coated for extra durability.

Corporate information

IMZ-Ural is a conglomerate of companies producing and selling classic sidecar motorcycles.

In November 1992, IMZ-Ural transformed into an open-end joint stock company "Uralmoto Joint Stock Company" a privatized entity owned 40% by management and employees through grant, 38% by auction with privatization vouchers (mostly management and employees also) and 22% retained by the government. In July 2000, the company was re-organised with the government's shares being redistributed to investors.

At the beginning of 1998 the business was bought by private Russian interests and it is no longer a State Company. The private owners have mandated new ideas, investments, management, production techniques, designs, technology and quality control of incoming, in-process and finished products.

In 2000, the company was sold to three entrepreneurs and broken into three components with the power production facilities, and foundry and forge being sold off.  They took that opportunity to reorganize the remaining factory.  It was originally spread over many, many acres because it had been such a major manufacturing plant, making thousands of motorcycles per month. Many employees were let go in the ensuing reorganization.

In 2022, the company moved production to Kazakhstan due to significant economic issues resulting from the Russian invasion of Ukraine.

Sources

External links

 IMZ Ural Motorcycles official page
 Ural sidecar motorcycles tours in the Urals
 Ural Motorcycles official page

Motorcycle manufacturers of the Soviet Union
Motorcycle manufacturers of Russia
Ural
Military motorcycles
Companies of the Soviet Union
Motorcycles powered by flat engines
Vehicle manufacturing companies established in 1941
Russian brands
Soviet brands
Companies based in Sverdlovsk Oblast
1941 establishments in the Soviet Union